Brian Blenkinsop (7 September 1931 – 21 April 2017) was a South African cricketer. He played in two first-class matches for Eastern Province in 1954/55.

See also
 List of Eastern Province representative cricketers

References

External links
 

1931 births
2017 deaths
South African cricketers
Eastern Province cricketers
Cricketers from Port Elizabeth
White South African people